Johannes Espelund (20 February 1885 – 20 April 1952) was a Norwegian sport shooter. He was born in Rakkestad, and his club was Christiania Skytterlag. He competed in the military rifle shooting at the 1912 Summer Olympics in Stockholm.

References

1885 births
1952 deaths
People from Rakkestad
Shooters at the 1912 Summer Olympics
Olympic shooters of Norway
Norwegian male sport shooters
Sportspeople from Viken (county)
20th-century Norwegian people